The 2017 Women's County One-Day Championship was the 21st cricket Women's County Championship season. It ran from April to August and saw 33 county teams and teams representing Scotland, Wales and the Netherlands compete in a series of divisions. Lancashire Women won the County Championship as winners of the top division with Yorkshire finishing runners-up. This was Lancashire's first Championship, and their victory saw them complete the double, after winning the Twenty20 Cup earlier in the season.

The tournament ran alongside the 2017 Women's Twenty20 Cup, and followed by the 2017 Women's Cricket Super League, a professional tournament competed for by franchise teams.

Competition format 
The championship works on a points system, the winner being the team with most average points of completed games in the first division. The points are currently awarded as follows:

Win: 10 points + bonus points. 
Tie: 5 points + bonus points. 
Loss: Bonus points.
Abandoned or cancelled: Match not counted to average.

Bonus points are collected for batting and bowling.  The bonus points for each match are retained if the match is completed.

Batting

1.50 runs per over (RPO) or more: 1 point
2 RPO or more: 2 points
3 RPO or more: 3 points
4 RPO or more: 4 points

Bowling

3-4 wickets taken: 1 point
5-6 wickets taken: 2 points
7-8 wickets taken: 3 points
9-10 wickets taken: 4 points

Teams 
The 2017 Championship was divided into three divisions: Division One and Division Two with eight teams each, and Division Three with 20 teams divided into 4 groups.

Teams in each group played each other once, except Division 3 Group A teams which played each other twice.

Division One 

As of 28 August 2017 — Source: ECB Women's County Championship

Division Two 

As of 28 August 2017 — Source: ECB Women's County Championship

Division Three

Group A 

As of 23 July 2017 — Source: ECB Women's County Championship

Group B 

As of 29 May 2017 — Source: ECB Women's County Championship

Group C 

As of 29 May 2017 — Source: ECB Women's County Championship

Group D 

As of 29 May 2017 — Source: ECB Women's County Championship

Promotion play-offs

Statistics

Most runs

Source: CricketArchive

Most wickets

Source: CricketArchive

References 

 
2017
2017 in Scottish cricket
2017 in Dutch cricket
cricket
cricket
cricket